HC Korosa was a handball club based in Gyeongsangnam-do, South Korea.

Honours 
Handball Korea League
Winners (1): 2014

South Korean Handball Festivals
Winners (3): 2004–05, 2005–06, 2008
Runners-up (2): 2001, 2002–03

References

External links
national-handball-teams.com profile

Handball clubs established in 2001
Sports clubs disestablished in 2016
South Korean handball clubs
2001 establishments in South Korea
2016 disestablishments in South Korea
Sport in South Gyeongsang Province